Ayasha Shakya (आयशा शाक्य) (born 28 July 1987 in Lalitpur) is a Nepalese Taekwondo practitioner. She won two gold medals in both the individual and pair poomsae category for Nepal in the 2019 South Asian Games. A mother of two, she has given encouragement to women who quit sports after getting married or having children.
She also won a gold medal for Nepal in the 2010 South Asian Games.

Shakya won a Bronze medal for Nepal in the 2006 Asian Games 2006 Doha.

References 

Living people
1987 births
Nepalese taekwondo practitioners